William T. Thurman (October 31, 1908 – January 14, 2001) was an American attorney who served as the United States Attorney for the District of Utah from 1961 to 1969.

He died on January 14, 2001, in Salt Lake City, Utah at age 92.

References

1908 births
2001 deaths
United States Attorneys for the District of Utah
Utah Democrats